The Umbrella Academy is an American comic book series created and written by Gerard Way and illustrated by Gabriel Bá. The first six-issue limited series, The Umbrella Academy: Apocalypse Suite, was released by Dark Horse Comics between September 14, 2007, and February 20, 2008. It won the 2008 Eisner Award for Best Finite Series/Limited Series. A second series, The Umbrella Academy: Dallas, followed in 2008. After a hiatus the series returned in 2018 with The Umbrella Academy: Hotel Oblivion released between October 3, 2018, and June 12, 2019.

A television adaptation premiered on Netflix in February 2019. In 2019, Dark Horse Comics signed a collaboration with Studio71 to make a card game based on The Umbrella Academy.

Synopsis

Plot summary
The titular team of The Umbrella Academy is described as a "dysfunctional family of superheroes". In the mid-20th century, at the instant of the finishing blow in a cosmic wrestling match, 43 superpowered infants are inexplicably born to random, unconnected women who showed no signs of pregnancy at the start of the day. Sir Reginald Hargreeves, a.k.a. The Monocle, an extraterrestrial disguised as a famous entrepreneur, adopts seven of the children and prepares them to save the world from an unspecified threat as the Umbrella Academy. In Apocalypse Suite, the team disbands and falls out of contact until they meet on the news of Hargreeves's death, and subsequently reunite when one of their own numbers becomes a supervillain.

Characters

The Academy is led by The Monocle (Sir Reginald Hargreeves), an alien disguised as a wealthy entrepreneur and world-renowned scientist. He adopts 7 of the 43 babies born that day who become the members of The Umbrella Academy, namely, Spaceboy (Luther Hargreeves), The Kraken (Diego Hargreeves), The Rumor (Allison Hargreeves), The Séance (Klaus Hargreeves), The Boy (Number Five), The Horror (Ben Hargreeves), and The White Violin (Vanya Hargreeves).

Influences
Way has stated that the biggest influence on this piece of work is his favorite writer, Grant Morrison and their work on Doom Patrol with DC Comics. He has also stated that Pat McEown of ZombieWorld: Champion of the Worms was a big influence on his work. Way has said that Edvin Biuković is his all-time favorite artist and that "his Grendel Tales are like my bible to draw from".

Main series

Volume 1: Apocalypse Suite

The Umbrella Academy is a team of superpowered children who fight evil for much of their childhoods under the tutelage of their guardian and mentor, Dr. Reginald Hargreeves. But the team breaks up, and nine years later, the estranged members are reunited by the death of the only parental figure they've ever known, and the rise of a new and terrible threat.

Volume 2: Dallas

The Umbrella Academy faces a number of catastrophic events and the death of a close ally. When a new threat emerges concerning a cabal of assassins, it is up to the Academy to combat the threat, but each member is distracted with their own problems.

Volume 3: Hotel Oblivion
In 2009, Gerard Way revealed the title of the third series entitled The Umbrella Academy: Hotel Oblivion. It was hinted that this could be the return of Dr. Terminal, as referenced by Spaceboy saying "no one could escape from the Hotel" (in  Apocalypse Suite issue No 3). Dark Horse originally announced Hotel Oblivion to be released sometime during 2010, but this did not transpire.

Gerard Way commented about the uncertainty of The Umbrella Academys future, stating that it would be a "really long time" before a release of Hotel Oblivion, as he planned to move away from comics "indefinitely" once the Killjoys series is complete, to focus his attention on his musical career. Way expressed to return to the comics "when it's right". Later in December 2013 Way confirmed that he and Gabriel Bá were to work on both Hotel Oblivion and the fourth installment of The Umbrella Academy during 2014.

Dark Horse finally released Hotel Oblivion in 2018, with Gerard Way and Gabriel Bá returning. The first issue of Hotel Oblivion was released on October 3 the same year and the series ended with issue #7 on June 12, 2019. The series was released in full with additional material on September 17 in the same year.

Volume 4: Sparrow Academy
In July 2020, Gerard Way revealed that Vol. 4 would be titled The Umbrella Academy: Sparrow Academy. While this story has not yet been released in print, it is the main plot line in season three of the show.

Short stories
A first short preview story of the series was released on November 2, 2006, on the Dark Horse Comics website. The first printed story was "…But the Past Ain’t Through With You", which appeared in the 2007 Dark Horse Comics Free Comic Book Day issue. Another story, "Safe & Sound", was published in July 2007 in Dark Horse Presents online on MySpace.

"Mon Dieu!"
An Internet preview was released on November 2, 2006, on the Dark Horse website. The story was colored by Dan Jackson and lettered by Jason Hvam. It is included in the Apocalypse Suite collection. The story is only two pages long and contains two main characters, The Séance, appearing as an adult, and Number Five. A time-travel machine causes the Séance to briefly experience life as a Medieval French military commander.

"…But the Past Ain’t Through With You."

The first printed story of the series, the title is a line from the B-side track "Kill All Your Friends" by Way's band, My Chemical Romance ("And you can sleep in a coffin, but the past ain't through with you"). "…But the Past Ain’t Through with You", appeared in the 2007 Dark Horse Comics Free Comic Book Day issue, released on May 5. It is included in the Apocalypse Suite collection. The comic book also features the début of Pantheon City written by Ron Marz and illustrated by Clément Sauvé and Zero Killer written by Arvid Nelson and illustrated by Matt Camp.

The story begins with Spaceboy, The Rumour, and The Séance finding The Rumour's body in an alley. The killer seems to be the 'Murder Magician' and his Assistant, who has hypnotized everyone at a talk show. The villains are defeated and the secret is uncovered. The Rumour had been sneaking out to meet up with a juggler and lying about going to the library. Her powers created a double that went to the library; this one was taken and slain. It's revealed the Monocle worked with the Magician to kill the copy to teach Rumour 'a lesson'. At the bottom of the final page, it states "... Some of the characters you have enjoyed today may or may not be living and/or dead by the next episode", hinting that The Horror dies soon after.

"Safe & Sound"
“Safe & Sound" is an eight-page story published in the first issue of the second volume of Dark Horse Presents in July 2007. The second volume of Dark Horse Presents (an anthology comic book, which was the first comic ever published by Dark Horse) appears monthly exclusively online on the social networking website MySpace for free. The title comes from a song Gerard Way worked on with Japanese rock singer Kyosuke Himuro for the movie Final Fantasy VII Advent Children Complete. The comic book also features stories for the series Sugarshock!, written by Joss Whedon and illustrated by Fábio Moon (Gabriel Bá's twin brother) and Samurai: Heaven and Earth, written by Ron Marz and illustrated by Luke Ross.

The story begins with The Kraken on top of a moving car occupied by criminals. The credits on the page say "Safe & Sound / featuring The Kraken / Formerly of the Umbrella Academy". The cars occupants, a driver, a man in the passenger seat with a Tommy gun, a Romani fortune teller in the back seat, and a little girl in the back seat are all aware that The Kraken is on top of the vehicle. After The Kraken stabs the top of the car, the fortune teller, who is holding a green crystal ball, orders the man in the front to shoot The Kraken, who manages to escape injury. When the girl in the back says that she wants to go home, the fortune teller tells her she can as soon as her father pays the ransom. The Kraken punches the man with the gun through the window, prompting the fortune teller to order the driver to slam the brakes. The Kraken and the man with the gun are ejected from the car, the latter going through the windshield. The driver then indiscriminately shoots at the clothing store with the Tommy gun. The Kraken emerges on top of the car (behind the fortune teller) and demands the release of the girl. She pulls out another cartomancy card with 'devil'. The driver shoots at The Kraken, who jumps towards him and punches him. The knocked-out man falls to the ground. The fortuneteller, still defiant, tells The Kraken not to produce his blade or else she will drop the green crystal ball, which she claims holds the life of the girl she is holding hostage. She claims that if it drops the girl will die. The Kraken throws his knife at the fortune teller's shoulder and she drops the crystal ball, which shatters on the ground. The fortune teller is shocked to see that the girl is still alive and is surprised by a punch delivered by The Kraken. The next scene shows the fortune teller being arrested who is hysterically saying that the girl should have died. Inspector Lupo (a character similar to Commissioner Gordon of Batman) thanks The Kraken for saving the mayor's daughter. The Kraken reaches into the back seat of the fortune teller's car and produces a crystal ball, identical to the one that was destroyed. He hands it in to the Inspector and tells him that it's "Something important. Take care of it".

"Anywhere But Here"
Dark Horse released the eight-page short story on their MySpace, and is also included in the Dallas collections and the MySpace Dark Horse Presents Volume 2 in 2009, collecting the online stories from MySpace Dark Horse Presents #7–12.

The story takes place thirteen years ago, during the group's teenage years. The Monocle is giving a long and boring speech to Diego (The Kraken) and Vanya (The White Violin), who are in a punk rock band called Prime 8's, in which Vanya plays the guitar, Diego plays the bass guitar, and an ape called "Body" plays the drums. The Monocle dislikes the band's music and the name of their debut album I Don't Wanna Kill the President, saying that this gives The Academy bad publicity. He gives Vanya a plane ticket to Paris, where she is supposed to study "real" music (classical), however, he is simply trying to separate Vanya from Diego. In his room, Diego convinces Vanya to play one last gig that night at a bar, and then with the money they would earn, they could run away from the Umbrella Academy to tour with the band. They agree to meet at the gig that night. At the bar, people are screaming to hear the Prime 8's, but Diego hasn't shown up yet. The owner of the bar demands to see the band playing at that moment or he'll send another band on, so Body decides to quit the band and say goodbye to Vanya. Vanya, upset at being let down by Diego, is walking down the street and passes by a shop selling TVs. The news is shown about a gang arrested by The Umbrella Academy, which they did with the help of Diego. Vanya walks away and gets into a taxi. The driver asks, "Going somewhere important?" Vanya answers, "Yeah, anywhere but here".

Tales from the Umbrella Academy
A spin-off series titled Tales from the Umbrella Academy was launched with a one-shot issue "Hazel and Cha-Cha Save Christmas" written by Gerard Way and Scott Allie with art by Tommy Lee Edwards on November 20, 2019. Dark Horse released a six-issue miniseries, You Look Like Death, written by Gerard Way and Shaun Simon with art by I.N.J. Culbard. The first issue was released on September 16, 2020 and the miniseries ended on February 24, 2021.

The hardcover edition includes an additional short story entitled "Seance'''" not published elsewhere.

Collected editionsThe Umbrella Academy is collected in trade paperbacks and limited edition hardcovers. The hardcover editions have larger pages and a few more extra features.

In other media
Television

A film version of The Umbrella Academy was optioned by Universal Studios, but never produced. The Umbrella Academy was instead developed into a television series rather than the original film, produced by Universal Cable Productions. Netflix had greenlit a live-action series adaptation of The Umbrella Academy in 2017, which premiered on February 15, 2019, with Steve Blackman serving as showrunner, and Way as an executive producer. The first season adapted the Apocalypse Suite storyline from the comics, focusing on a time-displaced Number Five traveling from the future to warn his siblings of the impending apocalypse.

The series was renewed for a second season, which was released on July 31, 2020. The second season focuses on the Umbrella Academy being sent back to the early 60's but each being separated and living new lives that lead up to the assassination of John F. Kennedy. The series was renewed for a third season, premiering June 22, 2022. The third season focused on the Umbrella Academy trying to stop a paradox created by them arriving in an alternate timeline, along with a new group of superheroes called the Sparrows.

Card game
In June 2019, Dark Horse Comics announced a collaboration with Studio71 to make a card game based on The Umbrella Academy.

References

External links

 The Umbrella Academy on Instagram
 
 
 The Umbrella Academy on Myspace
 Pastorek, Whitney. "Exclusive Peek: Gerard Way's 'Umbrella Academy'" , Entertainment Weekly''. June 25, 2007
 Khouri, Andy. "The Umbrella Academy" #2. Comic Book Resources. September 21, 2007
 MCR side projects – The Umbrella Academy
 MDHP Volume 2 TPB

Interviews
 Gerard Way: Flexing His Writing Muscles with Umbrella Academy, Comics Bulletin, August 27, 2007
 Gabriel Bá: Shaping Umbrella Academy's Landscape, Comics Bulletin – Gemma Milroy, September 11, 2007
 Gerard Way: Broadening Comics' Audience with Umbrella Academy, Comics Bulletin – Gemma Milroy, November 26, 2007
 The Umbrella Academy: Superhero kids in a class of their own, Sequential Tart, October 1, 2007
 Umbrella Academics: Way & Allie Talk Umbrella Academy #3, Comic Book Resources, November 19, 2007
 Comic Geek Speak: Episode 327 – Gerard Way Interview, Comic Geek Speak, November 16, 2007
 Apocalypse Suite: Way talks Umbrella Academy, Comic Book Resources, April 22, 2008
 An interview about The Umbrella Academy: Dallas, Newsarama, September 22, 2008
 Comics Done Gerard's Way: Umbrella Academy Unfurls..., Geek Monthly Magazine by PJ Hruschak, November 2008, pp. 72–74.

Reviews
 Sunday Slugfest – The Umbrella Academy: Apocalypse Suite #1 (of 6) Review and #3, Comics Bulletin
 The Umbrella Academy Dallas Spanish Review @ kopodo

Short stories
 “Mon Dieu!” (Internet preview)
 “Safe & Sound”
 "Anywhere But Here"

 
2007 comics debuts
Comics by Gerard Way
Comics adapted into television series
Eisner Award winners for Best Limited Series
Harvey Award winners for Best New Series
Dark Horse Comics superheroes